The discography of Hole, a Los Angeles-based American alternative rock band, consists of four studio albums, one compilation album, three extended plays, and 16 singles. 

Hole was formed in 1989 by vocalist and rhythm guitarist Courtney Love and lead guitarist Eric Erlandson. The band went through a number of line-up changes before recruiting bassist Jill Emery and drummer Caroline Rue in early 1990. The band signed to the independent label Caroline Records and its European subsidiary City Slang, and released its debut studio album, Pretty on the Inside, in August 1991. Pretty on the Inside was a critical success, especially in the United Kingdom, where the album's lead single, "Teenage Whore", peaked at number 1 in the UK Indie Chart. 

Following negotiations with a number of major labels, Hole signed a seven-album contract with DGC Records in 1992. Due to creative differences, Emery and Rue left the band prior to the deal and were replaced by Kristen Pfaff and Patty Schemel, respectively. Hole released its major label debut Live Through This in April 1994. A critical and commercial success, Live Through This was released a week after the death of Love's husband, Kurt Cobain, and two months prior to the death of bassist Kristen Pfaff. The band postponed the album's supporting tour and recruited bassist Melissa Auf der Maur. After constant touring in support of Live Through Thiss release, Hole went on a hiatus in 1995. In 1998, the band released its third studio album, Celebrity Skin, which debuted at number 9 on the Billboard 200. Following the tour in support of the album, Auf der Maur left the band and joined The Smashing Pumpkins in 2000, and Love and Erlandson disbanded Hole in May 2002. 

In 2009, Love announced that her second studio album, Nobody's Daughter, was due to be released as Hole's fourth studio album and announced the band's reformation. Although Erlandson claimed that no reformation was possible for legal reasons, Hole released Nobody's Daughter worldwide on April 23, 2010. The album received mixed critical response and was a commercial failure. In 2013, Love announced that Hole was "dead", and that she was abandoning the moniker and returning to recording and performing as a solo artist.

Hole's studio albums alone have sold over 3 million copies in the United States, according to Nielsen SoundScan. Live Through This and Celebrity Skin have been certified platinum in the United States and Canada, and certified gold in Australia. "Malibu", a single from Celebrity Skin, has also been certified gold in Australia.

Albums

Studio albums

Compilation albums

Live albums

Extended plays

Promotional extended plays

I  Virgin Records released "Ask for It" in Japan and Canada.
II  Only released in France.

Singles

Split singles

Other charted songs

Music videos

I  Unreleased music video recorded in early 1993, featuring Nirvana frontman Kurt Cobain.
II  Two edits of "Doll Parts" exist, the second being known as the "Producer's Version."

Miscellaneous

Unofficial label releases

See also
 Courtney Love discography
 Melissa Auf der Maur discography

References

External links
 Hole at Geffen Records
 
 

disco
Discographies of American artists
Rock music group discographies